The Cartoon Art Museum (CAM) is a California art museum that specializes in the art of comics and cartoons. It is the only museum in the Western United States dedicated to the preservation and exhibition of all forms of cartoon art. The permanent collection features some 7,000 pieces as of 2015, including original animation cels, comic book pages and sculptures.

Until September 2015, the museum was located in the Yerba Buena Gardens cultural district of San Francisco, in the South of Market neighborhood. It reopened in October 2017, in a new location in the Fisherman's Wharf area of San Francisco.

History 
The Museum was founded in 1984 by comic art enthusiasts, with its primary founder being Malcolm Whyte, the publisher of Troubador Press. CAM's first incarnation had no fixed location, instead organizing showings at other local museums and corporate spaces. In 1987, with the help of an endowment from cartoonist Charles Schulz, it established a home on the second floor of the San Francisco Call-Bulletin Building in the South of Market (SoMa) area.

In late 1994 the museum temporarily closed while it moved locations again, re-opening in the summer of 1995. Primary founder Malcolm Whyte retired from the museum's board of directors around the same time.

In 1997, the museum suffered through serious financial difficulties, and was almost forced to close—this was despite a new endowment fund from the Schulz Foundation.

Jenny E. Robb served as curator of the Cartoon Art Museum from 2000 to 2005. (Robb is now curator of the Billy Ireland Cartoon Library & Museum in Columbus, Ohio.) Current curator Andrew Farago took over from Robb in 2005.

In 2001, the museum moved to a ground-floor location at 655 Mission Street in SoMa, which had been vacated by the Friends of Photography Ansel Adams Center. It closed the location in mid-September 2015 after the lease expired; the owners more than doubled the rent.

In late 2016, the museum signed a 10-year lease on a historic, 8,000-square-foot brick building a block away from Ghiradelli Square. Almost a year later, during late October 2017, the Cartoon Art Museum finally reopened its doors at its new location with three new exhibitions, including a retrospective of the San Francisco cartoonist Raina Telgemeier, a tribute exhibition of Mike Mignola's Hellboy, and the emerging artist showcase featuring Nidhi Chanani.

Sparky Award 
Over the years, the Museum has presented the Sparky Award (after the nickname of Charles M. Schulz), in honor of the lifetime achievement of prominent creators in the fields of cartooning and animation who "embody the talent, innovation and humanity of Schulz." The award, which is co-sponsored by the Charles M. Schulz Museum, includes a statuette of Snoopy holding a pen and leaning on an inkwell. (The CAM Sparky Award is not connected to the award of the same name presented at the Slamdance Film Festival.)

The award debuted in 1998, and multiple winners were announced each year until 2001. After a six-year hiatus, the award was again presented in 2007. The most recent Sparky Award was given in 2015.

The Sparky Award has been presented at various venues, including the San Diego Comic-Con and the New York Comic Con.

List of Sparky Award winners:
 1998 – Charles M. Schulz, Chuck Jones, and John Lasseter
 1999 – Sergio Aragonés, Gus Arriola, Carl Barks, and Dale Messick
 2000 – Ward Kimball, Stan Lee, and Morrie Turner
 2001 – John Severin, Will Eisner, Phil Frank, Lou Grant, Gary Larson, and Bill Melendez
 2007 – Creig Flessel
 2008 – Gene Colan (and, in an earlier ceremony, Malcolm Whyte)
 2010 – Mort Walker
 2011 – Jerry Robinson
 2015 – Ron Turner—presented in conjunction with the first annual San Francisco Comics Fest

Exhibitions
The Museum hosts nine to 12 major exhibitions annually, along with classes for children and adults. It also offers lectures and operates a research library, a classroom and a bookstore.

References

External links

 
 Twitter page

Art museums and galleries in San Francisco
Cartooning museums
Media museums in California
Art museums established in 1984
1984 establishments in California
South of Market, San Francisco
1984 in San Francisco
Charles M. Schulz